Sara Radman (born 20 July 1993) is a German group rhythmic  gymnast. She represents her nation at international competitions. 

She participated at the 2012 Summer Olympics in London. 
She also competed at world championships, including at the 2009, 2010, 2011 and 2013 World Rhythmic Gymnastics Championships.

References

External links

1993 births
Living people
German rhythmic gymnasts
Place of birth missing (living people)
Gymnasts at the 2012 Summer Olympics
Olympic gymnasts of Germany